Philippe Lardy (born 1963) is a Swiss painter, illustrator, art director and a graphic novelist. He attends the School of Visual Arts in the 1980s in New York.

Drawing for the press 
In, 1989, he co-publishes a large publication, GIN & COMIX in collaboration with artist Jose Ortega, showcasing an international cast of graphic artists and writers.

Lardy begins his career as an illustrator, drawing for American periodicals, publishers and corporations such as The New York Times, Blue Note Records, Levis, Time, Rolling Stone, Newsweek, The New Yorker.

From Drawing to Painting 
Lardy moves to Paris in 2000 and gives greater emphasis to his painting. He exhibits his works in various galleries in Geneva and France.
The Swiss artist engages in a free interpretation game based on twined twisted paper strips, evoking the DNA structure, a main source of inspiration for his paintings, drawings and sculptures. Details of these models are enlarged, synthesized. His "Life Forms" evoke a possibility of organic evolution of these motifs, echoing the possibilities of genetic recombination.

Almanac Soldes Fin de Séries 
Since 2008, Lardy is the art director of a French publication Almanach Soldes Fin De Séries. It was originally created by the Belgian designer Marc Borgers.

New York Chronicle 
Philippe Lardy is the author of New York Chronicle. The book recollects his encounters with inspiring artists and the life in the city.
- AGPI 2009

Hypersomnia 
Lardy's graphic novel is inspired by visions of the subconscious. The main character, a painter, experiences often traumatizing, sometime enlightening situations in his search for the ultimate work of art. The novel is drawn in a detailed manner, echoing Max Klinger's pre-modernist images.

Recognition 
 Ozzie Award Silver Medal for magazine cover (2002) 
 Coretta Scott King Award (2006) for the paintings of A Wreath for Emmett Till, written by poet Marylin Nelson.  
 Boston Globe-Horn Book Honors Awards
 Michael L. Printz Honor (2006).
 American Illustration, Communication Arts, the Society of Illustrators, PRINT magazine and GRAPHIS.
Philippe was a founder member of the society of press, book and commercial illustrators "Le Crayon", Paris.

Recent Exhibitions 
Biennale of contemporary art,"ARTPARIS" 2018.
 Represented by Espace Muraille Galerie, Geneva Switzerland and Artelli Gallery, focus on the Swiss Art scene.
Biennale of contemporary art,"ARTPARIS". 
COSMOSKOW 2018, Russian Contemporary Art fair
LIFE FORMS Forms, 2016 Espace Muraille, Geneva.
LIFE FORMS Paris, 2012, Galerie Plaisirs, Paris.
Group shows: Japan, New York, Belgium, Italy, France, Belgium, Switzerland, Canada, Seoul.

Bibliography 
 New York Chronicle, a monograph on Philippe Lardy, 
 Soldes Almanach Fin de Séries
 Resuscitation of a Hanged Man, by Denis Johnson, 
 Passages, 
 Numerology, by Julie Mars, 
 A Wreath for Emmett Till, by Marilyn Nelson, paintings by Philippe Lardy,  Boston Globe-Horn Book Honors Awards, 2006 Coretta Scott King Honor and 2006 Michael L. Printz Honor

References

External links 

Villa Berlasconi Centre d'Art
 Radio Interview, in French

1963 births
Artists from Basel-Stadt
Living people
Swiss male painters
Swiss illustrators